
Gmina Filipów is a rural gmina (administrative district) in Suwałki County, Podlaskie Voivodeship, in north-eastern Poland.

Neighbouring gminas
Gmina Filipów is bordered by the gminas of Bakałarzewo, Dubeninki, Gołdap, Kowale Oleckie, Olecko, Przerośl and Suwałki.

Villages
The gmina contains the following villages having the status of sołectwo: Agrafinówka, Bartnia Góra, Bitkowo, Czarne, Czostków, Filipów (divided into four sołectwos: Filipów Pierwszy, Filipów Drugi, Filipów Trzeci and Filipów Czwarty), Garbas (divided into two sołectwos: Garbas Pierwszy and Garbas Drugi), Huta, Jemieliste, Mieruniszki, Nowa Dębszczyzna, Olszanka, Piecki, Rospuda, Smolenka, Stara Dębszczyzna, Stare Motule, Supienie, Szafranki, Tabałówka, Wólka and Zusno.

References
Polish official population figures 2006

Filipow
Suwałki County